Narayan Rayamajhi (born 25 April 1961) is a Nepali composer, lyricist, feature-film script writer, film director, and producer. He has steadily excelled as a singer and he has made a significant contribution to promote Nepali music industry. He has written more than fourteen dozen folk songs, more than six dozen modern songs, two dozens soap-opera songs, three musical plays, two documentaries and has he directed two movies Gorkha Paltan and Pardeshi

Early life
Narayan Rayamajhi was born on 25 April 1961 in Jhadewa −05, Palpa District Nepal to Suryabhadur Rayamajhi and Krishna kumari Rayamajhi. He had a keen interest in musical field from his childhood. He embraced himself with many musical and cultural possessions. He learned to play musical instruments on his own. Later on his early 20s he moved to Kathmandu to initiate his Nepali music career, obtained Bachelor in Arts (B.A.) from Tribhuvan University and Diploma in Vocal from Prayag Sangeet Samiti, Allahabad India. Rayamajhi delegation to persuade his dream follows the foot step of his Late elder brother Laxman Rayamajhi. Rayamajhi has been an advisor of the Music Museum Nepal for some 20 years and he has continuously supported and aided the museum in many sphere during the time by filming, directing and editing he was a member of jury of international folk music film festival in 2012. He has played a vital role in promoting and protecting endangered Nepal Folk music.

Personal life
Rayamajhi was married to Chanda Rayamajhi and have three children, Alina Rayamajhi, Saru Rayamajhi and Paras Rayamajhi. The late Laxman Rayamajhi, his elder brother has played significant role in his life, two younger sisters Shakuntala Rayamajhi, Chadani Rayamajhi, followed by his two younger brothers Jeevan Rayamajhi and Durga Rayamajhi who are also active in Nepali Music Industry.

Employment records
 (From 1985 to 2007) Music Coordinator Officer, Radio Nepal, Ministry of Information and Communication
 (From 1987 to Present) Director, Reema Recording Studio, Kathmandu Metropolitan City −11, Thapathali, Kathmandu
 Director – Television Program- Hamro Riti Hamrai Saskriti ( Our ritual and Our culture), Nepal Television

Singing career
Rayamajhi's songs are extensively popular in the Nepalese community all around the world. His two modern songs albums Priya and Preeti including More than sixty modern songs recorded in Radio Nepal. Folk songs album Lahure ko Jindaki , Bala jovan, Dori furkale, Bhangang ka suseli, Sai, Malmal Pacheure, Belijai , Baisa dhalkinai lagyo, Chori ko juni, Deusi Vhailo, Dharo Dharma, Ralemai, Kargil, Joban Karja ma, Phool butte choli, Piratiko Dhoko, Rodhi ghar ko Ramjham, Saikai, Taxi motor car, Teej ko Ramjham was very prevalent in Nepali Folk Music Industry. He has deliberated and researched about the Nepalese typical cultural song and dance Sorathi. He also runs one of the best music company in Nepal called "Reema Digital Recording Studio". Narayan Rayamajhi is known as inspirational figure to the new generation who wants to follow his footstep in Nepali Music Industry. He has come a long way to create a history and expertise in traditional folk musical and cultural sector.

Filmography as director 

He also have directed few of the musical dram which achieved huge success.
 Kargil  (Which is based on gorkhali soldiers story )
 Aaradhya Rodhan  (Violence against women)

Working as a Judge

Visit / Performance of Cultural Program

United States, international folk festival, 2009 and 2010 
Japan (at Least 15 programs over major cities-1993) 
Finland (Helsinki cultural musical show-1990) 
Russia (cultural program-1990) 
China, cultural show-1993 and film show in Hong Kong, 2011 
Qatar (musical show-1999) 
Thailand (cultural program-2009) 
France (International folk festival-2011) 
Israel (film show and cultural program-2011) 
Spain (International folk festival-2007) 
Korea (musical performance-2007) 
Singapore (cultural show-2007) 
Italy (International folk festival-2011) 
Germany (International folk festival-2007) 
Poland (International folk festival-2007 and 2012) 
Belgium (International folk festival and film show-2011) 
Netherlands, International folk festival-2011) 
Taiwan (International folk festival, 2014
United Arab Emirates, cultural program, 2016 
Oman (film show and cultural program-2016) 
India- at least six programs over major cities of the country
Nepal – almost all major parts and cities of the country

References

Nepalese film directors
Nepalese male writers
Nepali-language writers
1963 births
Living people
Nepalese folk singers
Nepalese Hindus
Performers of Hindu music
People from Palpa District
Tribhuvan University alumni
Dohori singers
21st-century Nepalese screenwriters
21st-century Nepalese film directors